Carolyn Law (born 1951) is an American artist known for her mixed media and public artworks.

Public art
2011, Social Intricacy/The Beach, Kirkland Transit Center, Seattle
2010, Wenatchee Sewage Treatment Plant,  Wenatchee, Washington
2006, Before Now, Depot Park, Santa Cruz, California
2001 Tonalea Landmarks, Scottsdale, Arizona

Collections
Works by Law are included in the collections of the Seattle Art Museum and the Washington State Arts Commission.

References

1951 births
Living people
20th-century American women artists
21st-century American women artists